Yevgeni Viktorovich Burdinskiy (born 10 February 1972) is a former Russian football player.

References

1972 births
Living people
Soviet footballers
Russian footballers
FC Zhemchuzhina Sochi players
Russian Premier League players
FC Tyumen players
FC Zvezda Irkutsk players
Association football midfielders
Association football forwards
FC Chita players